Khalid Kamal Yaseen (born 10 October 1982) is a Bahraini long-distance runner who specializes in the marathon.

He was born in Kenya as Peter Ndegwa, but changed name and nationality in 2005. He won the silver medal at the 2006 Asian Games. He finished 29th at the 2007 World Championships, 39th at the 2008 World Cross Country Championships and 40th at the 2007 World Championships. He won the Madrid Marathon in 2009.

His personal best times are 28:10.89 minutes in the 10,000 metres, achieved in June 2006 in Neerpelt; 1:02:35 hours in the half marathon, achieved in April 2005 in Manama; and 2:11:43 hours in the marathon, achieved in May 2008 in Düsseldorf.

Achievements

References

1982 births
Living people
Bahraini male long-distance runners
Kenyan male long-distance runners
Asian Games medalists in athletics (track and field)
Athletes (track and field) at the 2006 Asian Games
Athletes (track and field) at the 2010 Asian Games
Kenyan emigrants to Bahrain
Naturalized citizens of Bahrain
Bahraini male marathon runners
Kenyan male marathon runners
Asian Games silver medalists for Bahrain
Medalists at the 2006 Asian Games